Paraamblyptilia eutalanta is a moth of the family Pterophoridae. It is known from Argentina and Chile.

The wingspan is 15–16 mm. Adults are on wing in November and December.

External links

Platyptiliini
Moths described in 1931
Taxa named by Edward Meyrick
Moths of South America